Hoseynabad (also Romanized as Ḩoseynābād; also known as Ḩoseynābād-e Khodābandehlū) is a village in Khodabandehlu Rural District, in the Central District of Sahneh County, Kermanshah Province, Iran. At the 2006 census, its population was 98, in 24 families.

References 

Populated places in Sahneh County